Kai Wulff (born December 18, 1949 in Germany) is an American actor and voice actor.

He is perhaps best known for his role as Lt. Colonel Yuri Voskov in Firefox and 'The German' in Three Amigos.

He appeared in the films Twilight Zone: The Movie, Oscar, Top Dog, and Assassins, X-Men: Apocalypse (2016).

During the 1980s and 1990s, he guest-starred in several television series, often as villain, such as The A-Team, MacGyver, Knight Rider, Street Hawk, 
Walker, Texas Ranger, Hart to Hart and Days of Our Lives.

Since 1996 he works mainly as voice actor in video games, such as Captain America: Super Soldier, in which he voices Baron Strucker. 
Occasionally he also provides voices for German dubbings of American films including Al Pacino in Scarface and Robin Williams in Man of the Year.

He is married to Carolyn Wulff, they have one child.

Filmography

Film

Television

Video games

External links 
 
 
 Kai Wulff – Voice Actor Profile at Voice Chasers
 

American male film actors
American male television actors
American male voice actors
American people of German descent
Living people
1949 births